Gobiobotia macrocephala is a species of small freshwater fish in the family Cyprinidae. It is endemic to South Korea.

References

 

Gobiobotia
Fish described in 1935